Égérie is the French spelling of the nymph Egeria. It may also refer to:

Égérie, French corvette Départment des Landes
Égérie, correspondence of Henri-Frédéric Amiel

Music
Égérie, a 1997 album by Silvain Vanot

Songs
"L'Égérie", song by François Audrain
"Pop Égérie O", song by Étienne Daho
"L'Égérie", song by Gérard Darmon
"Égérie" (song), a 2015 song by Nekfeu
"Égérie", song by Silvain Vanot